is a Japanese virtual YouTuber. She began posting videos as an independent creator in March 2018. In May 2019, she became affiliated with Hololive Production through their newly created music label, INoNaKa Music, before joining the agency's main branch later the same year. Her YouTube activity consists primarily of live streaming herself singing karaoke, playing video games, talking to her fans, or collaborating with other talents. She is particularly well known among fans for her skill at Tetris and her singing ability.

As of January 2023, she has 1.7 million subscribers on YouTube. As a singer, she released a digital single "Next Color Planet" in March 2020, which peaked at 5th on the Oricon daily digital single ranking, and another, "Ghost", in April 2021, which peaked at 1st. Additionally, her first album, "Still Still Stellar", was released on 29 September 2021, and peaked at 5th on the Oricon daily album ranking, the highest ever solo VTuber album performance. Outside of her streaming and musical activity, she has appeared on Japanese television and radio programs as a virtual personality.

Career
Hoshimachi Suisei created her YouTube channel on 18 March 2018 and revealed her initial character design and model, illustrated and rigged by herself, on Twitter that same day. She posted her first video to YouTube on 22 March 2018, debuting as an independent virtual YouTuber and self-proclaimed idol. She joined the VTuber agency S:gnal on 2 July 2018, but left a month later on 4 August. She released her first original song, "Comet", on 22 November 2018, and her second, on 22 March 2019, both as YouTube music videos.

On 19 May 2019, Hoshimachi joined Hololive Productions via , its newly created music label, with VTuber AZKi. She announced on Twitter on 28 November 2019 that she would be transferring to the all-female Hololive agency. Cover Corp., Hololive's parent company, also officially announced the transfer on 29 November, to be carried out on 1 December. Hoshimachi also received a new Live2D model built by Live2D animator rariemonn based on an updated character design by Teshima Nari.

In October 2019, Hoshimachi started live streaming on bilibili. After her 3D model's debut concert on 1 March 2020, her popularity on the site grew tremendously. This stream garnered over tens of thousands of live viewers on bilibili. On 17 March 2020, her number of jiànzhǎng (舰长, or "captains", viewers who donate over 198 renminbi to a particular streamer every month), surpassed 1,000, over 700 of whom joined during the aforementioned concert. She was the fourth streamer and first VTuber on the platform to reach that milestone.

Hoshimachi performed in the "Hololive 1st fes. Nonstop Story" concert at the Toyosu PIT on 24 January 2020 with every member of Hololive at that time. She reached the 100,000 subscriber milestone on YouTube on 31 January 2020. On 1 March 2020, Hoshimachi debuted her 3D model, created by Yatsurugi. This stream was watched by 55,000 live viewers and its associated Twitter hashtag was at one point the top trending hashtag in the world.

On 22 March 2020, Hoshimachi released her first single under Cover Corp., "Next Color Planet", which ranked 5th in the Oricon daily digital single ranking on the day of its release.

On 13 April 2021, Hoshimachi released her next digital single "Ghost", which ranked 1st on Oricon daily digital single ranking, also reaching 1st on other digital single charts such as iTunes Japan, Amazon Music Japan, and Mora. "Ghost" also became the first VTuber-produced song to remain in Oricon's daily single ranking for two days in a row, reaching #4 on 15 April, as well as the first VTuber-produced song to chart in Oricon's weekly single ranking, reaching #11. The song also charted on Billboard Japan's weekly ranking of downloadable songs, reaching #5 for the week of April 12 to 18.

In the summer of 2021, Hoshimachi announced a series of three back-to-back monthly digital extended play releases, starting with "Bluerose / Comet" on 25 June. On 8 July, she released   On 21 August, she released , featuring a song which she had previously uploaded on 16 August as part of a collaboration with Chunithm.

On 29 September 2021, Hoshimachi released her first album, Still Still Stellar, which she had announced in July that year. Her album charted 5th place on the Oricon Daily Album Ranking, becoming the best-ever performing solo VTuber album. Additionally, she charted first on iTunes in Japan and numerous other regions including Hong Kong, Malaysia, Singapore, and Taiwan.

On 21 October 2021, Hoshimachi performed her first paid concert, "STELLAR into the GALAXY", at Tokyo's Toyosu PIT with streaming on SPWN, featuring NIJISANJI VTuber Inui Toko and fellow Hololive member AZKi as guests.

On 31 March 2022, the project Midnight Grand Orchestra, a collaboration between Hoshimachi and composer TAKU INOUE, with whom Hoshimachi had previously collaborated, was announced to start under the label VIA/TOY'S FACTORY. Their first single, "SOS", was released shortly on April 13, along with an accompanying YouTube music video on the project's new channel.

Midnight Grand Orchestra later announced their first album, featuring 7 songs, including "SOS", on 28 April of that year. It was released on 27 July 2022, and the group performed in a SPWN-streamed concert mixing virtual and real elements and featuring a live band on 20 August.

On 20 January 2023, Hoshimachi appeared on the YouTube channel The First Take, becoming the first VTuber to perform on the popular channel. Her one-take version of "Stellar Stellar" quickly exceeded 5 million views and broke the channel's premiere live viewership record.

On 25 January 2023, Hoshimachi's second full-length album, Specter, was released, after having been announced in November of the previous year, along with her second paid concert, "Shout in Crisis", which she performed live at Tokyo Garden Theatre, with streaming on SPWN and ZAIKO, on 28 January. Specter included previously released songs as well as "7days", which was featured as the theme song for the game Dyschronia: Chronos Alternate.

Activity 
Hoshimachi's YouTube activity consists primarily of live streaming herself singing, playing video games, talking to her fans, or collaborating with other talents. Hoshimachi has created illustrations for hers and other VTubers' channels, and has worked as a video editor for VTubers from Re:AcT and Hololive.

Radio 

On 4 April 2021, immediately after the end of MUSIC SPACE, Hoshimachi began a new radio program, with voice actress Azusa Tadokoro, also for Cho A&G+.

Television 

 V-on! Sakura Music Live (19 March 2020, REALITY (Internet TV))
  (20 March 2020 BS Nippon)
  (14 August 2020, NHK)
 (7 December 2020, NHK Educational TV)
 (14 January 2021,TV Asahi)
 (25 August 2021 and 23 February 2022, Nippon TV and SPWN (Internet TV))
 (29 August 2021, SPWN (Internet TV))
  (13 August 2022, NHK Educational TV)
 (20 August 2022, Nippon TV)
 (29 December 2022, TVer and hulu (Internet TV))

Live
※ indicates appearance through live streaming.

2019 
 The Shitest Start (22 May 2019, Akihabara Entasu)
 INNK EXHiBiTiON (9 May 2019, Akihabara Entasu)

2020 
  (24 January 2020, Toyosu PIT)
  (16 February 2020, 3331 Arts Chiyoda Taiikukan)
 It's a Virtual Pop World! (3 July 2020, SPWN)※
  (19 July 2020, SPWN・bilibili <Chinese Area only>)※
 Bilibili Macro Link 2020 (25 July 2020, bilibili)※
 BilibiliWorld 2020 (7–9 August 2020, Shanghai New International Expo Center)
Tokyo Tower Firework Festival XR: Cosmic Flower (東京タワー花火大会XR〜COSMIC FLOWER〜) (6 September 2020, YouTube/Niconico Douga/bilibili stream)※
TOKYO IDOL FESTIVAL Online 2020 (4th day) (4 October 2020, live streamed via TOKYO IDOL FESTIVAL site)※
SUISEI MUSIC "POWER" LIVE (22 November 2020, Nissin Power Station)※
Inui Toko 1st Solo Live "who i am" (10 December 2020, KT Zepp Yokohama)
 Hololive 2nd fes. Beyond the Stage (2nd day) (22 December 2020) – pay-per-view live stream on Niconico and SPWN, sponsored by Bushiroad※

2021 
 VILLS vol.2 (21 March 2021, SPWN)※
 V-Carnival (Day 1) (3 April 2021, SPWN)※
TUBEOUT! Vol.10 (31 July 2021, SPWN)※
Hoshimachi Suisei 1st Solo Live "STELLAR into the GALAXY" (21 October 2021, Toyosu PIT, SPWN) – co-sponsored by Bushiroad※

2022 

 Hololive 3rd fes. Link Your Wish (1st Day) (19 March 2022, Makuhari Event Hall, SPWN/Niconico) -  co-sponsored by Weiß Schwarz and others※ 
 VTuber Fes Japan 2022 (2nd Day) (30 April 2022, Makuhari Messe, Niconico) ※
 V-Carnival vol.2 (2nd Day) (12 June 2022, eplus) ※
 Midnight Grand Orchestra 1st LIVE "OVERTURE" (20 August 2022, SPWN) ※

2023 
Hoshimachi Suisei 2nd Solo Live "Shout in Crisis" (28 January 2023, Tokyo Garden Theater, SPWN/ZAIKO)※

Discography

Singles

Extended plays

Albums

As part of Hololive Idol Project

Songs not published with Cover

As part of Midnight Grand Orchestra

Notes

References

External links

 

Hololive Production
21st-century Japanese singers
21st-century Japanese women singers
Year of birth missing (living people)
Living people
Japanese YouTubers
YouTube channels launched in 2018
YouTube streamers